Gasteroagaricoides is a fungal genus in the family Psathyrellaceae. The genus is monotypic, containing the single species Gasteroagaricoides ralstoniae, described from Norfolk Island by English mycologist Derek Reid in 1986.

See also
 List of Agaricales genera

References

 

Psathyrellaceae
Fungi of Australia
Monotypic Agaricales genera
Taxa named by Derek Reid